Channabasappa Mahalingappa Udasi (1937 - 2021) was an Indian politician from Karnataka, who was once with Janata Dal, and later with Bharatiya Janata Party at the time of his death. He joined BJP in 2004. Later he had left BJP briefly and joined Yediyurappa's Karnataka Janata Paksha in 2013. 

Udasi contested every Karnataka Vidhan Sabha election from Hangal (constituency) from 1983 to 2018. He was elected in 1983, 1985, 1994, 2004, 2008 and 2018. He lost in 1989, 1999, 2013, each time to Manohar Tahasildar. Five of his six wins were gained by defeating Tahasildar.   

Udasi was the minister of rural development and Panchayati raj, minister of minor irrigation,  minister for handlooms and textiles, and public works department under three Chief Ministers J. H. Patel, Ramakrishna Hegde and B. S. Yediyurappa. Udasi died from age related factors aged 84.

References 

1937 births
2021 deaths
21st-century Indian politicians
People from Haveri district
Bharatiya Janata Party politicians from Karnataka
Karnataka MLAs 2018–2023
Karnataka MLAs 2008–2013
Janata Party politicians
Janata Dal politicians
Janata Dal (United) politicians
Karnataka Janata Paksha politicians